The Calventuras Islands are a small group of islands off the coast of Ayeyarwady Region, Burma.

Geography
It has two smaller islets off its northern end.

See also
List of islands of Burma

References 

Islands of Myanmar
Ayeyarwady Region